George Grosz' Interregnum is a 29-minute-long documentary film about the artist George Grosz produced by Altina Carey and Charles Carey, and narrated by Lotte Lenya. It was nominated for an Academy Award for Best Documentary Short. The original music was by Paul Glass, and the cinematography by Terry Sanders. The film was released on video as "Germany Between The Wars." The Academy Film Archive preserved Interregnum in 2013.

See also
 List of American films of 1960

References

External links

Interregnum at the American Film Foundation

1960 films
American short documentary films
1960s short documentary films
Documentary films about painters
George Grosz
1960s English-language films
1960s American films